Josef Mai (1887-1982) was a German First World War fighter ace credited with 30 confirmed and 15 unconfirmed aerial victories while flying combat for Jagdstaffel 5. While flying for them as a sergeant pilot, he shot down enemy aircraft from August 1917 until war's end. Mai was noted as being one of a trio of high-scoring sergeant pilots called the Golden Triumvirate whose collective victories for Jagdstaffel 5 totaled more than 100; the other two aces were Otto Könnecke and Fritz Rumey.

List of victories

Victories are reported in chronological order. Where aircrew casualties are reported, the pilot's name is listed first, followed by that of the observer/gunner.

This list is complete for entries, though obviously not for all details. Background data was abstracted from Above the Lines: The Aces and Fighter Units of the German Air Service, Naval Air Service and Flanders Marine Corps, 1914–1918, pp. 100–101, and The Aerodrome webpage on Josef Mai . Abbreviations were expanded by the editor creating this list.

Aerial victories of Mai, Josef
Mai, Josef